The 2003 Badminton Asia Championships was the 22nd tournament of the Badminton Asia Championships. It was held at the Tennis Indoor Gelora Bung Karno in Jakarta, Indonesia.

Medalists

Medal table

Finals

Semi-finals

References

External links
Semi final results

Badminton Asia Championships
Asian Badminton Championships
2003 Badminton Asia Championships
Badminton Asia Championships
Badminton Asia Championships